Hay v Chalmers [1991] 3 NZBLC 102,000 was a New Zealand case in which a mechanic made defamatory comments about the plaintiff, and instead of taking defamation action in the courts, a costly and complex action, instead sought compensation instead for misleading conduct under section 9 of the Fair Trading Act 1986, where there are few legal defences.

Background
Hay was the former accountant of Chalmers, and Chalmers, a self-employed mechanic made defamatory remarks to numerous suppliers and creditors of that he had not only misappropriated money from him, but that he was also currently under investigation for this misconduct. All of which was later proven to be false. As a result of these statements, the plaintiff lost clients and suffered a financial loss.

Rather than Hay sue Chalmers for defamation, he instead chose to file an action for damages under the Fair Trading Act where there are few defences, where all the plaintiff had to prove that these statements were misleading, and that they were made in the course of trade.

Held
The court held that the statements were both misleading, as well as being made in the course of trade, and was awarded $80,000 in damages under the Fair Trading Act.

New Zealand case law
1991 in case law
1991 in New Zealand law